Recollection is a greatest hits album by k.d. lang. The album was released in 2010.

Track listing 
Single Disc Version
 "Constant Craving" – 4:37
 "Calling All Angels" – 5:17
 "Crying" – 3:48
 "Hallelujah" – 5:08
 "Helpless" – 4:15
 "What a Wonderful World" – 3:21
 "Miss Chatelaine" – 3:50
 "Golden Slumbers / The End" – 4:17
 "Wash Me Clean" – 3:17
 "Simple" – 2:44
 "Pullin' Back the Reigns" – 4:22
 "Black Coffee" – 3:17
 "Beautifully Combined" – 2:44

Double Disc Version

Disc One
 "Trail of Broken Hearts" – 3:24
 "Constant Craving" – 4:37
 "The Air That I Breathe" – 6:14
 "Helpless" – 4:15
 "You're Ok" – 3:02
 "Western Stars" – 3:14
 "The Valley" – 5:30
 "Summerfling" – 3:51
 "Miss Chatelaine" – 3:49
 "I Dream of Spring" – 4:01
 "Hallelujah" – 5:08
Disc Two

 "Help Me" – 4:00
 "Hush Sweet Lover" – 4:06
 "Beautiful Combined" – 2:43
 "Crying" – 3:48
 "Love For Sale" – 5:26
 "Golden Slumbers/The End" – 4:17
 "Barefoot" – 4:17
 "Moonglow" – 4:32
 "So In Love" – 4:35
 "Calling All Angels" – 5:17
 "Hallelujah"  (New Version)  – 5:36

Charts

Weekly charts

Year-end charts

Decade-end charts

Certifications

See also 
 List of number-one albums of 2010 (Australia)

References 

K.d. lang albums
2010 compilation albums